Washington, D.C.'s Slickee Boys' third "proper" album (not including compilations or live releases),  Uh Oh… No Breaks!  was released on LP and cassette in March 1985 by Twin/Tone (a Minneapolis label best known for having released The Replacements' early records) with the catalog number TTR 8544. Almost half of the album is re-recorded versions of songs they had previously released. 
There are cover version of songs originally by the French band the Dogs, 1960s garage band the Squires, Perry Como (by way of the Downliners Sect), and D.C. all-star punkers the Afrika Korps (a band which included a few Slickee Boys).

Track listing
 "Dream Lovers" – 3:48 (John Chumbris, Dan Palenski, Mark Noone)
 "Death Lane" – 1:58 (Dominique Laboubée)
 Originally recorded by the Dogs, 1982
 "Teenage Romance" – 3:05 (Marshall Keith, Martha Hull, Palenski)
 "Disconnected" – 2:46 (Noone, J. Charney)
 "Gotta Tell Me Why" – 3:58 (Noone)
 "The Brain That Refused to Die" – 3:21 (The Slickee Boys)
 "Bad Dream" – 2:50 (Noone)
 "Can't Believe" – 3:43 (Keith, Noone)
 "Going All the Way" – 2:06 (Mike Bouyea)
 Originally recorded by the Squires, 1966
 "Glendora" – 2:01 (Ray Stanley)
 Originally recorded by Perry Como, 1956, also recorded by the Downliners Sect, 1966
 "Danger Drive" – 2:24 (Noone)
 "Jailbait Janet" – 2:13 (Kenne Highland, Noone)
 Originally recorded by the Afrika Korps, 1977
 "When We Were Kids" – 3:32 (Noone)

Personnel

The band
 Kim Kane – Rhythm guitar, backing vocals
 Marshall Keith – Lead guitar, keyboards, backing vocals
 Dan Palenski – drums, percussion, backing vocals
 Mark Noone – Lead vocals, guitar
 John Chumbris – Bass guitar, keyboards, backing vocals, guitar

Production
 Recorded by Paul Stark
 Steve Fjelstad – Re-mixes of "Death Lane" and "Teenage Romance"
 Howie Weinberg — Mastering (at Masterdisk)

Additional credits
 Recorded at Nicollet Studios, Minneapolis, Minnesota
 Kim Kane — Cover art
 Dan Palenski – Graphics
 Sona Blakeslee — Typesetting
 Dan Corrigan – Photo
 Ruth Logsdon — Hand tinting
 John Hansen – Loyal crew
 Rob Lingenfelder – Loyal crew
 Dedicated to the memory of Roger Anderson

Sales
8,340 vinyl albums and 797 cassettes.

Alternate releases
Released on LP, May 1985, by the French record label New Rose (catalog number ROSE 57).

Sources
 LP liner notes
 Trouser Press
 New Rose discography

References

The Slickee Boys albums
1985 albums